KCCC-LP (98.5 FM) was a low-power FM radio station licensed to serve the community of Hays, Kansas, United States. The station was owned by Celebration Community Church and broadcast from 2005 to January 1, 2019.

References

External links
 

CCC-LP
CCC-LP
Radio stations established in 2005
Radio stations disestablished in 2019
Defunct radio stations in the United States
Defunct religious radio stations in the United States
2005 establishments in Kansas
2019 disestablishments in Kansas
CCC-LP